Pterostylis chocolatina,  commonly known as the chocolate-lip leafy greenhood,  is a plant in the orchid family Orchidaceae and is endemic to New South Wales. As with similar greenhoods, plants in flower differ from those that are not. Plants not in flower have a rosette of leaves on a short stalk, but when in flower, plants lack a rosette and have up to thirteen green flowers on a flowering stem with stem leaves. The labellum is dark brown with a blackish lump near its base.

Description
Pterostylis chocolatina, is a terrestrial,  perennial, deciduous, herb with an underground tuber. The dorsal sepal and petals are joined to form a hood called the "galea" over the column. Flowering occurs from July to September.

Taxonomy and naming
The chocolate-lip greenhood was first formally described in 2006 by David Jones who gave it the name Bunochilus chocolatinus. The description was published in Australian Orchid Research from a specimen collected near Wentworth Falls. In 2010, Gary Backhouse changed the name to Pterostylis chocolatina. The specific epithet (chocolatina) is a Latin word meaning "chocolate brown", referring to the colour of the labellum.

Distribution and habitat
Pterostylis chocolatina grows between grasses and other small plants in moist, tall forest in the western Blue Mountains.

References

chocolatina
Endemic orchids of Australia
Orchids of New South Wales
Plants described in 2006